Martin Damm and Radek Štěpánek were the defending champions.  Damm partnered with Leander Paes, losing in the semifinals.  Štěpánek partnered with Tomáš Berdych, losing in the quarterfinals.

Paul Hanley and Kevin Ullyett won in the final 1–6, 6–2, [10–1], against Mark Knowles and Daniel Nestor.

Seeds

Draw

Draw

External links
Draw

2006 Dubai Tennis Championships
2006 ATP Tour